() lies in the municipal region of Sanming, Fujian province, China.

Transportation
Jianning is rather remote; its county-town Suicheng is serviced only by three provincially maintained roads, namely: 
 east to Taining county-town 
 south to Ninghua county-town 
 west to the watershed/provincial border, whence north to Nanfeng county town, Jiangxi

On September 26, 2013, the Xiangtang–Putian Railway entered service, connecting Jianning to China's railway network.

Administration

Towns (镇, zhen)
Other than the county seat Suicheng, Jianning has only three towns - 
Lixin (里心) 
Xikou (溪口)
Junkou (均口)

Townships (乡, xiang)
There are six townships - 
Xiyuan
Huangfang
Huangbu
Kefang
Yijia
Jinxi

Climate

References 

County-level divisions of Fujian
Sanming